Generation Jets was a children's television show created for the New York Jets. It aired Saturdays at 1 p.m. on WCBS-TV in New York City, and has won two day-time Emmy awards.

Generation Jets follows five school-aged kids as they explore New York City's landmarks. They learn from their adventures and interaction with players and coaches from the New York Jets.

Generation Jets is produced by New York based production company B-Train Films.

External links
 New York Jets: "Generation Jets"
 B-Train Films Website

New York Jets
English-language television shows
2003 American television series debuts
2004 American television series endings
2000s American animated television series
American children's animated sports television series
Animated television series about children
Local sports television programming in the United States
Local children's television programming in the United States
Television shows set in New York City